Bol or BOL may refer to:

Entertainment
 BOL (band), a Norwegian electronica band
 Bol (music), a feature of Indian rhythm
 Bol (soundtrack)
 Bol (film), a 2011 Pakistani film directed by Shoaib Mansoor
 BOL Entertainment
 BOL Network, a Pakistani media group

Places
 Bol (Swabian Jura)
 Bol, Chabahar, Iran
 Bol, Chad, a city in Chad
 Bol, Croatia, a town on the Croatian island of Brač
 Bol, Mazandaran, Iran
 Boľ, a village in eastern Slovakia

Other
 Bol (surname)
 BOL (engineering), the abbreviation for Beginning of Operational Life
 bol.com, a Dutch online web shop
 Bol Airport, an airport on the Croatian island of Brač
 Bol loop, an algebraic structure
 Bill of lading, a document acknowledging specified goods as cargo
 Brasil Online, an Internet portal 
 Bread of Life Ministries International, a non-denominational Christian megachurch in the Philippines
 MF Bol (built 2005), a ferry owned by Croatian shipping company Jadrolinija
 2-Bromo-LSD, a pharmacological agent
 BOL or BOLO in law enforcement parlance, the abbreviation for "Be On the Lookout" (see all-points bulletin)
 BOL, country code for Bolivia
 Bol., the abbreviated botanical author citation of Henry Nicholas Bolander
 Bug Out Location, a term for Retreat
 Bol, As in the term "Best Of Luck" Termination

See also
 Boll (disambiguation)
 Bole (disambiguation)
 Bols (disambiguation)
 Bowl (disambiguation)
 Croatian Bol Ladies Open, a tennis tournament